The Cotton Club is the soundtrack to the movie of the same name. The album won the Grammy Award for Grammy Award for Best Large Jazz Ensemble Album in 1986.

Track listing

Charts

Personnel

 John Barry – conductor
 Bob Wilber – conductor, alto and soprano saxophone, clarinet
 Frank Wess – alto, soprano, and baritone saxophone, clarinet
 Chuck Wilson – alto and soprano saxophone, clarinet
 Lawrence Feldman – alto and soprano saxophone, clarinet
 Joe Temperley – alto and baritone saxophone, bass clarinet
 Dave Brown – trumpet, vocals
 Marky Markowitz – trumpet
 Randy Sandke – trumpet
 Lew Soloff – trumpet
 Dan Barrett – trombone, valve trombone
 Joel Helleny – trombone
 Britt Woodman – trombone
 Tony Price – tuba
 Bob Stewart – tuba
 Mark Shane – piano
 John Goldsby – bass
 Mike Peters – guitar, banjo
 Chuck Riggs – drums
 Brian Brake – drums
 Dave Samuels, Danny Druckman, Gordon Gottlieb, Ronnie Zito – percussion
Priscilla Baskerville - vocalist on "Creole Love Call"

References

1984 soundtrack albums
Big band albums
Grammy Award for Best Large Jazz Ensemble Album
John Barry (composer) soundtracks